Amekawa Dam is a check dam on Ame river in Saku, Nagano Prefecture, Japan. The primary purpose is reducing water flow velocity to counteract erosion. It is also used for water supply.

The pole of inaccessibility of Japan lies near this dam.

See also
 List of dams and reservoirs in Japan

References 

 Saku City's "Guide to Amekawa Dam" (Local Information Board)

External links 
Official website (in Japanese)

Dams in Nagano Prefecture
Dams completed in 1974
Gravity dams